The Capitol Hill Seattle Blog (also known as CHS Blog) is a hyperlocal news website covering the Capitol Hill neighborhood of Seattle, United States. Established in 2006, its publisher is Justin Carder. 

Its reporting has been sourced by the Seattle Times, Seattle Metropolitan, KCPQ-TV, the Puget Sound Business Journal, and others.

References

External links
 

American news websites
Mass media in Seattle
2006 establishments in Washington (state)